James Albert Ogilvie "Odie" Cleghorn (September 19, 1891 – July 13, 1956) was a Canadian professional ice hockey player, coach, linesman and referee. His brother Sprague Cleghorn also played professional ice hockey and the two played several seasons together.

Ice hockey career
Odie Cleghorn came up through the ranks of the Montreal Westmount of the intermediate section of the CAHL, where he played alongside his older brother Sprague and future Hockey Hall of Fame referee Cooper Smeaton. For the 1909–10 season the trio left for New York to play for the New York Wanderers of the American Amateur Hockey League, finishing second in the league standing behind the New York Athletic Club. Although the Brooklyn Daily Eagle praised Cleghorn after the season as "one of the best right wings that ever has played on a New York team", the newspaper also brought criticism over his rough play "that kept him with the timers for long sessions in every contest.

The next season, in 1910–11, Odie and Sprague left New York to play with the Renfrew Creamery Kings of the National Hockey Association.

Cleghorn played ten seasons in the National Hockey League for the Montreal Canadiens and Pittsburgh Pirates. On Jan. 14, 1922, Odie and his brother Sprague Cleghorn each scored 4 goals in a 10-6 victory for the Montreal Canadiens over the Hamilton Tigers. Cleghorn won a Stanley Cup in 1924 with Montreal.

Cleghorn was also a coach of the Pirates. It was during the 1925–26 season that he created the idea of set lines. He would play three set lines that would rotate. Before this, the players would only rest when needed.

During the 1928 Stanley Cup Finals, when New York Rangers's coach Lester Patrick had to step in as goalie for an injured Lorne Chabot, Odie took over Lester's duties as coach behind the Rangers bench for the rest of the game. 

Cleghorn refereed for a time in the NHL.  He was the referee at Boston Garden during the infamous December 12, 1933 game in which Boston's Eddie Shore severely injured Toronto's Irvine (Ace) Bailey, fracturing his skull and nearly killing him.  Cleghorn was severely criticized by hockey writers for his lenient handling of the volatile game.

Odie Cleghorn's brother Sprague Cleghorn died of injuries following a car accident. Just a few hours before Sprague's July 14, 1956 funeral, Odie Cleghorn, was found in his bed, dead of heart failure, perhaps induced by the stress of the loss of his brother.

Career statistics

Coaching record

References
 
Notes

External links

1891 births
1956 deaths
Anglophone Quebec people
Canadian ice hockey coaches
Canadian ice hockey right wingers
Ice hockey people from Montreal
Ice hockey player-coaches
Montreal Canadiens players
Montreal Wanderers (NHA) players
National Hockey League officials
Pittsburgh Pirates (NHL) coaches
Pittsburgh Pirates (NHL) players
Renfrew Hockey Club players
Stanley Cup champions